Fashion King is a 2012 South Korean television drama starring Yoo Ah-in, Shin Se-kyung, Lee Je-hoon, and Kwon Yuri. It aired on SBS from March 19 to May 22, 2012 on Mondays and Tuesdays at 21:55 for 20 episodes.

Plot
Fashion King tells the story about a young aspiring designer Kang Young-gul (Yoo Ah-in) who has nothing and starts his fashion business as a vendor on Dongdaemun Market. He has never had any goals or dreams for a bright future until he meets Lee Ga-young (Shin Se-kyung) who loses both parents in an accident at a young age and grows up into a smart, determined young woman with a natural talent for designing. After receiving a scholarship to the New York Fashion School, Ga-young travels to America hoping to achieve her dream of becoming a designer.

Meanwhile, Jung Jae-hyuk (Lee Je-hoon) is a second-generation chaebol to a large enterprise that covers construction, distribution, and fashion, while his ex-girlfriend, Choi Anna (Kwon Yuri) now works under a top internationally renowned designer. Gradually, Jung Jae-hyuk loses interest in Choi Anna and sets his sights onto Lee Ga-young. But Ga-young's heart is for Young-gul, and Young-gul's heart is for Anna, so will this love square ever be settled? And who will win and become Fashion King?

Cast

Main Cast 
Yoo Ah-in as Kang Young-gul
Shin Se-kyung as Lee Ga-young
Kwon Yu-ri as Choi Anna
Lee Je-hoon as Jung Jae-hyuk

Supporting cast
Jang Mi-hee as Madame Jo 
Han Yoo-yi as Shin Jung-ah
Cha Seo-won as Miss Go 
Ra Jae-woong as Chil-bok 
Kim Il-woo as Jung Man-ho 
Lee Hye-sook as Yoon Hyang-sook 
Yoon Gi-won as Secretary Kim 
Kim Byeong-ok as Director Kim

Extended cast
Seo Young-joo as young Kang Young-gul 
Kim Sae-ron as young Lee Ga-young 
Go Soo-hee as Young-gul's employee
Ra Mi-ran as Young-gul's employee
Jang Eun-bi as Young-gul's employee
Lee Han-wi as Hwang Tae-san 
Shin Seung-hwan as Jang Il-gook 
Ki Eun-se as Soo-ji 
Yoo Chae-yeong as Bong-sook 
Tory Burch as herself (cameo)
Vincent D'Elia as himself (cameo)

Soundtrack

Ratings
In the tables below, the blue numbers represent the lowest ratings and the red numbers represent the highest ratings.

Awards and nominations

International broadcast
 It aired in Vietnam on HTV2 from December 7, 2012.
 It aired in Thailand on Workpoint TV in 2012.

References

External links
 Fashion King official SBS website 
 
 

2012 South Korean television series debuts
2012 South Korean television series endings
Seoul Broadcasting System television dramas
Korean-language television shows
South Korean romance television series
Fashion-themed television series